Alsos Forest (officially Paidagogiko Institouto Alsos) is one of the municipal parks of Nicosia. The park forms an almost unbroken stretch of open land reaching from Pallouriotissa to Aglandjia.  The forest is bounded on the northwest by the entrance to the University of Cyprus, and overlooks Cyprus European Presidential building and Aglandjia Public High School, located to its southeast. The park is one of Nicosia's largest ecological havens.  It hosts a large playground, cafeteria, paths through the forest for pedestrians, and basketball and football courts.

History
The park was largely developed during the early 20th century.  Most of the land had previously been a large wetland with shallow bodies of water. It had a large number of hammocks, or dry-land protrusions, covered by aquatic vegetation.  Under the effort of the British colonial government during their administration of the island, numerous Eucalyptus trees, brought from Australia, were planted, in order to absorb the water.

See also
 Nicosia municipal gardens
 Nicosia
 Cyprus

References

Parks in Cyprus
Urban public parks
Nicosia